Cock Bridge is a settlement in Aberdeenshire, Scotland, located in the Cairngorms National Park, on the A939 road near Corgarff and Corgarff Castle, between Bellabeg at Strathdon in Aberdeenshire, on the road to the Lecht ski centre, and towards Tomintoul in Moray.

Villages in Aberdeenshire